Hanne Dahl (born 30 August 1970) is a Danish priest and former politician from Aalborg. She was a member of the European Parliament, representing the June Movement 2008–2009.

References

1970 births
Living people
Politicians from Aalborg
June Movement MEPs
MEPs for Denmark 2004–2009
21st-century women MEPs for Denmark
Danish clergy
21st-century Danish clergy